Renato Fiacchini (born 30 September 1950), known by the stage name Renato Zero, is an Italian singer, songwriter, producer, dancer and actor whose career spans from the 1960s to the 2020s. Zero is the only artist to have reached the top of the Italian charts in six different decades. With 20 million records sold, he is one of the best-selling Italian music artists.

Early life and career
Zero was born Renato Fiacchini in central Rome, in Via di Ripetta, next to the famed Via del Corso.

He quit his studies early to devote himself to his true passion, the arts, more specifically playing music and singing – though initially with little success. From an early age, he would wear make-up and cross-dress. He replied to the criticisms he received (including the recurring insult Sei uno zero! – "You're a zero!") by taking on the pseudonym Renato Zero. He recorded his first songs in 1965: "Tu", "Sì", "Il deserto", "La solitudine", which were never issued. His first published single, "Non basta sai/In mezzo ai guai" (1967), sold a total of 20 copies and was quickly forgotten.

He had several different jobs, including an appearance in an advertisement for ice-cream; work as a dancer in a TV show; playing and dancing in two musicals; and minor roles in two Fellini movies. He became friend to sisters Mia Martini and Loredana Berte.

In the early 1970s Zero's career was given a boost by the glam-rock movement, from which he benefited with his sexual ambiguity and androgynous appearance. At the same time, this led him to being accused of emulating other celebrities like David Bowie and, in particular, Marc Bolan. In 1973 he issued his first LP, No! Mamma, no! (recorded live), but still with little success. The follow-up Invenzioni met the same fate.

Birth of "Zeromania"
It was not until 1976 that he scored his first hit with the single "Madame", a collaboration with songwriter Franca Evangelisti and composer Piero Pintucci, with whom Zero continued to work in the years that followed. "Madame" and the album including it, Trapezio, established a regular and loyal audience for Zero. This was to increase exponentially in the following years, until he could boast a huge following of die-hard fans that he dubbed Sorcini ("Little Mice"). Among his greatest hits at the time, all of them topping and breaking the Italian charts for quite some time, "Mi vendo", "Morire qui", "Triangolo", "Baratto" are still popular in Italy, and were among all disco clubs’ playlists.

The late 1970s and early 1980s were years of great success for Zero's character, with the LPs Zerofobia ("Zerophobia", 1977), Zerolandia (1978), Erozero (1979), Tregua (1980), Artide Antartide (1981), Via Tagliamento (1982) and Calore (1983) topping the Italian charts. At this time Renato Zero was amongst the two or three most popular singers in Italy and his songs "Il Cielo", "Il Carrozzone", "Amico", "Più su" and "Spiagge" were already regarded, by fans and critics, as some of the best Italian songs ever.

The name Zerolandia also referred to the moving theatre (a circus tent with a capacity of 5,000) in which he performed shows throughout Italy. On numerous occasions fans would participate in the gigs, made-up like Zero and dressed in his typical costumes.

In 1979 Zero played himself in the movie Ciao Nì (his usual greeting to his fans, which is a term of endearment that can be roughly translated as "Hi, Dear!"). In Italy this film grossed more than the American blockbuster Superman.

In 1980 he founded his own record label called Zeromania Music.

The ‘80s: career dip
In the 1980s he began to abandon make-up and greasepaint, but this did not rid Zero of his mania for grandeur: in the 1980 tour, for example, he entered the stage riding a white horse. In 1982 he began a collaboration with the opera director Renato Serio, who was to write the string arrangements for almost all of Zero's following LPs. In late 1982 he took part in RAI's Fantastico 3, then the most popular Italian TV show.

His career continued to be successful until 1984. That year, however, his new album Leoni si nasce, that he presented in a press conference disguised as a lion and was escorted by four aborigines, was a commercial failure, even though it peaked at No. 1. His 1987 album Zero marked the lowest point of his career, peaking at No. 13 but then almost immediately disappearing from the Italian charts.

1990s: the comeback
In 1991 Renato Zero participated in the Sanremo Music Festival with the song "Spalle al muro", and from that moment on his career began to rise again. In 1993 he ranked No. 1 on the Italian charts with the LP Quando non-sei più nessuno. The following year L'imperfetto repeated this success. His concerts would regularly sell out, and he returned to his famous dress changes, although in a more balanced style.

In the mid-1990s Zero dubbed the character of Jack Skellington and sang the songs in the Italian release of Tim Burton's motion picture The Nightmare Before Christmas.

In 1999, he sang his hit song "Il Cielo" at Pavarotti and Friends together with tenor Luciano Pavarotti, and later the same year, Italian diva Mina paid him a tribute with her album Mina n° 0, containing ten of Zero's songs, including one sung in duet with him.

From 2000s to 2020s
In 2004 his tour "Cattura il sogno/Il sogno continua" ("Catch the dream/The dream continues") was awarded by Pollstar magazine as the most successful of the year in Italy as well as one of the most successful worldwide (#30). The recording of his concerts in Rome, held at Olimpico Stadium in June, was the top selling musical DVD in 2004.

In 2005 he took part in the Italian staging of Live 8, in the Circo Massimo. In November his new album Il dono ("The Gift") topped the charts and maintained the No. 1 position until the end of the year. In December 2005 he performed in the Vatican with a song dedicated to Pope John Paul II. He also advocated for safe sex with condoms. Renato Zero's 2006 tour was entitled "Zeromovimento" and involved 25 concerts. After 40 years of his musical career, in February 2006 he refused the Career Award at the Sanremo festival, stating that the award should be for artists who had reached old age.

In 2007 he toured again in major Italian cities, filling sports stadiums. The tour was called "MpZerO", and attracted 270,000 spectators over seven dates, of which 120,000 filled the Olympic Stadium of Rome, his hometown.

Presente, his 30th album, was released in Europe and the Americas on 20 March 2009. It went multi-platinum in Italy, with 80,000 copies sold in the first week. It sold over 350,000 copies. Following the release of Presente, Renato toured again in autumn 2009; the "Zeronove tour" saw 30 sold-out dates and was the most successful gig of the year in Italy. On 10 December the music video for "Ancora qui", the first single from the album Presente, won the best Italian video of the year. In September 2010 Presente (CD edition + special CD+DVD edition) was certified by FIMI as the top selling album in Italy during the years 2009–2010. In 2012 Sei Zero was certified as the top selling DVD of 2011.

In 2013 he released two new albums, Amo – capitolo I and Amo – capitolo II; both peaked at No. 1 on the Italian charts. During 2013–2014 he toured again, after a three-year hiatus; his new show, "Amo in tour", saw all 59 concerts sold out, with a record tenure in Rome (twenty dates), Milan (eight dates) and Florence (eight dates).

On 13 February 2016, he was guest of honor at the Sanremo Music Festival. On that occasion he announced his next album, Alt, to be released on 8 April that year. On 2 March "Chiedi", the first single from Alt, peaked at No. 1 on the iTunes chart. The album later debuted at No. 1 on the official FIMI Italian albums chart.

On 6 November 2020 "Zerosettanta vol. 2" peaked at No. 1 on the Italian album charts, making Renato Zero the only artist in history to have reached the top of the charts in six different decades.

Zero's accomplishments
Renato Zero is the only artist to have reached number 1 on the Italian charts in six different decades (1970s, ‘80s, ‘90s, 2000s, 2010s and 2020s). He has had no fewer than 30 albums in the Top 10.

Renato Zero has an album (Presente) certified Diamond by FIMI, a goal officially achieved in the Italian charts history by only five artists (Vasco Rossi, Ligabue, Jovanotti and Modà being the others).

He likes to work with other artists, and has written songs for numerous other singers as well. With his particular approach in performances, shows and tours, he is a leading live performer in his country and obtained a unique spot in the Italian musical scene.

Throughout his career, Renato Zero has been a campaigner against drug abuse. His ‘grand force’ is regarded to be having shown "the normality of the diverse", convincing the public that diversity feeds our human abilities to feel and act with love, respect, solidarity and faith.

Personal life
Though the general consensus was that he is bisexual or gay, but conservative in not wanting to reveal his sexuality, Zero self-identified as heterosexual during an Italian talk-show. Zero has admitted to having two relationships; one with Enrica Bonaccorti, a famous television host, and another with Lucy Morante, his former secretary.

His image has changed through the decades, from the flamboyant, makeup-wearing transvestite of the mid-1970s, reminiscent of Marc Bolan or The Rocky Horror Picture Show’s Dr. Frank'N'Furter, to today's somber, blue-suit-clad icon of no specific gender and unspecified age, his only affectation a head of jet-black hair and a thin veil of foundation and lip gloss.

Discography and videography

Filmography

Films

Television

References

External links

 (Italian and English) 
Zeromania, fan site
Renato Zero, tribute space

1950 births
Italian singer-songwriters
Living people
Singers from Rome